Initiating Prosperity is a Chinese historical television series based on events in a period in Chinese history known as the Transition from the Sui dynasty to the Tang dynasty. The series was directed by Wang Wenjie and starred Shen Xiaohai, Liu Wenzhi, Zhang Zijian, Sun Feifei and Bao Guo'an. It was first broadcast on television stations in China in 2006.

Cast

 Shen Xiaohai as Li Shimin
 Sun Feifei as Princess Yuerong
 Bao Guo'an as Emperor Yang of Sui
 Saren Gaowa as Empress Xiao
 Liu Guanxiong as Yuwen Shu
 Zhao Yi as Yuwen Huaji
 Lü Zhuoda as Yu Shiji
 Zhang Youfei as Gao Junya
 Li Bao'an as Wang Wei
 Zhang Fumin as Song Laosheng
 Wang Yongquan as Gao Deru
 Yu Weiping as Sang Xianhe
 Wang Jin as Sima Dekan
 Cui Binbin as Yang Tong
 Lei Kesheng as An Jiatuo
 Zhang Chengxiang as Yuan Wendu
 Du Zhiguo as Yu Zhi
 Liu Wenzhi as Emperor Gaozu of Tang
 Zhang Zijian as Li Jiancheng
 Yang Dong as Li Yuanji
 Wu Cheng as Li Zhiyun
 Li Ping as Lady Wan
 Yao Di as Lady Yuwen
 Zhang Na as Lady Yin
 Song Song as Consort Zhang
 Song Xiaona as Empress Zhangsun
 Liu Yijun  as Feng Deyi
 Wang Wei as Xiao Yu
 Xie Gang as Pei Ji
 Su Zaiqiang as Liu Wenjing
 Zhang Guosheng as Qutu Tong
 Hou Yong as Wei Zheng
 Zhang Yuanrong as Zhangsun Wuji
 Hu An as Fang Xuanling
 Zhou Hao as Du Ruhui
 Zhang Wei as Yuchi Gong
 Liu Difei as Li Jing
 Bao Hailong as Qin Shubao
 Ye Erjiang as Cheng Yaojin
 Zhang Dagui as Liu Zhenghui
 Ma Jie as Hou Junji
 Huo Ercha as Shibi Khan / Jieli Khan
 Renqing Dunzhu as Tuli Khan
 Yang Fan as Zhishisili
 Wang Wensheng as Dou Jiande
 Li Qishan as Wang Shichong
 Li Zhenqi as Li Mi
 Zhang Hongtao as Duan Da
 Guo Changhui as Wang Bodang
 Senge as Wu Duan'er
 Xia Tian as Xue Rengao
 Min Xiding as Chen Si
 Zhang Mengxing as Yuanzhen
 Liu Fengxue as Yuanli
 Jin Hanning as Dugu An
 Li Feng as Dugu Benxin
 Deng Ming as Linghu Da
 Shi Lei as Hu Er

References

External links
  Initiating Prosperity on Sina.com

2006 Chinese television series debuts
Television series set in the Tang dynasty
Television series set in the Sui dynasty
Mandarin-language television shows
Chinese historical television series
Cultural depictions of Emperor Taizong of Tang